Giácomo Mello Corbellini (born 8 November 1992), sometimes known as just Mello, is a Brazilian footballer who last played for Cymru Premier side Connah's Quay Nomads. He holds an Italian passport.

Club career
A product of Botafogo’s academy, Mello played for teams in Brazil, Italy and Poland. He played in Kazakhstan for Akzhayik
before in August 2020 he signed for Welsh side Bangor City. He left the club in January 2022.  He then joined Connah's Quay Nomads leaving the club at the end of the 2021–22 season.

Career statistics

Club

Notes

References

External links
 
 
 Mello at Footballdatabase

1992 births
Living people
Brazilian footballers
Brazilian expatriate footballers
Association football midfielders
Segunda Divisão players
I liga players
Ekstraklasa players
Botafogo de Futebol e Regatas players
Tombense Futebol Clube players
Ruch Chorzów players
Zagłębie Sosnowiec players
FC Akzhayik players
Brazilian expatriate sportspeople in Portugal
Expatriate footballers in Portugal
Brazilian expatriate sportspeople in Italy
Expatriate footballers in Italy
Brazilian expatriate sportspeople in Poland
Expatriate footballers in Poland
Brazilian expatriate sportspeople in Kazakhstan
Expatriate footballers in Kazakhstan
Bangor City F.C. players
Expatriate footballers in Wales
Cymru North players
Connah's Quay Nomads F.C. players
Brazilian expatriate sportspeople in Wales
Footballers from Porto Alegre